Alejandro Enrique Grullón Espaillat (Santiago de los Caballeros, April 3, 1929 – Casa de Campo, La Romana, December 15, 2020) was a banker and businessman from the Dominican Republic.

Biography 
Grullón Espaillat was born to Manuel Alejandro Grullón Rodríguez-Objío (1895–1985) and Amantina Rafaela Espaillat González (1903–2006). He married Ana Dínorah Viñas Messina (1929–2001) in 1952, and later after he divorced, then he married Melba Segura Castillo (born 1956). He was grandnephew of Arturo Grullón and second cousin of Juan Isidro Jimenes Grullón.

He founded Banco Popular Dominicano in January 1964, today the largest private bank in the Dominican Republic. He was the chairman of the Board of Directors of Grupo Popular until April 2014, when he left his post to his son Manuel Alejandro Grullón (1953–). He was also co-founder of the NGO Fundación Sur Futuro.

Ancestry

References

1929 births
2020 deaths
Descendants of Ulises Espaillat
Dominican Republic bankers
Dominican Republic billionaires
20th-century Dominican Republic businesspeople
Dominican Republic people of Breton descent
Dominican Republic people of Canarian descent
Dominican Republic people of Catalan descent
Dominican Republic people of French descent
Dominican Republic people of Italian descent
People from Santiago de los Caballeros
White Dominicans